Arthroleptis zimmeri, also known as Zimmer's screeching frog, is a species of frog in the family Arthroleptidae. It is endemic to Ghana, and is known only from its type locality in Accra. The specific name zimmeri honours Carl Wilhelm Erich Zimmer, a German zoologist.

References

zimmeri
Frogs of Africa
Amphibians of West Africa
Endemic fauna of Ghana
Amphibians described in 1925
Taxa named by Ernst Ahl
Taxonomy articles created by Polbot